The Scoresby Land Group is a geologic group found in the Jameson Land Basin, Scoresby Land, East Greenland. It preserves fossils dating back to the Triassic period. It comprises the Wordie Creek Formation (Lower Triassic), Pingo Dal Formation (?Lower Triassic), Gipsdalen Formation (Middle to Upper Triassic) and the Fleming Fjord Formation (Upper Triassic). It is underlain by Upper Permian beds of the Schuchert Dal Formation and overlain by Rhaetian beds of the Kap Stewart Group.

See also

 List of fossiliferous stratigraphic units in Greenland

References

Geologic groups of Europe
Geologic groups of North America
Geologic formations of Greenland
Triassic Greenland